Deh-e Bala (also Romanized as Deh-e Bālā; also known as Chāh Bālā) is a village in Galleh Dar Rural District, Galleh Dar District, Mohr County, Fars Province, Iran. At the 2006 census, its population was 343, in 66 families.

References 

Populated places in Mohr County